2008 was a year. It may also refer to:

 Peugeot 2008, a 2013–present French subcompact SUV
 Peugeot 2008 DKR, a 2016 French rally raid car
 Zotye 2008, a 2005–2016 Chinese subcompact SUV